"About Damn Time" is a song by American singer and rapper Lizzo, released on April 14, 2022, by Nice Life Recordings and Atlantic Records as the lead single from her fourth studio album Special (2022). The song reached number one in the United States, becoming her second number one single there, while reaching the top three in ten additional countries, as well as number six on the Billboard Global 200 chart. The song was nominated at the 2022 MTV Video Music Awards for Song of the Year, Best Pop Video, and Song of Summer. The song won Record of the Year at the 65th Annual Grammy Awards making her the first female rapper to win the award, also receiving nominations for Song of the Year and Best Pop Solo Performance. Additionally, Purple Disco Machine's remix won the Grammy Award for Best Remixed Recording.

Background 
"About Damn Time" was the final song created for Special. Prior to the song's creation, Lizzo felt the album was not yet complete, so she wanted to write a song that had the same uplifting emotional impact as "Good as Hell."

Blake Slatkin, a co-writer and co-producer of the song, explained in a 2022 Billboard interview that he and Ricky Reed began creating the song in January of that year. According to Slatkin, the song began with four piano chords which Reed used as a basis for a bassline. At that point, the two played Lizzo the instrumental, motivating her to travel to the studio to contribute to the track. Slatkin credits Lizzo with crafting the hook and melodies. The song required approximately thirty additional studio sessions to finish, spanning four months. At one point, the song featured an entirely different chorus from the one included in the final release.

About the song's thematic content, Lizzo stated, "I think life had thrown some major traumas and hard experiences at us, especially globally these last few years. And I wanted to write a song that allowed us to take a moment and celebrate our survival, and celebrate how far we’ve come."

Composition 
Billboard Rania Aniftos said "About Damn Time" has a "feel-good" chorus, and Rachel Brodsky of Stereogum described the song as "a funk-pop cut with tons of instant-classic Lizzo-isms". Similarly, Alex Gallagher of NME called the song "a funk-tinged, classically Lizzo cut that comes replete with a groove-heavy bassline, an instantly memorable flute melody and lyrical gems". Nardine Saad from the Los Angeles Times said the song has an "affirmative, instantly uplifting disco beat", Ree Hines from Today labeled the record as "a uplifting disco bop".

The song's chorus features a piano motif interpolated from the 1984's tune "Hey DJ" by The World's Famous Supreme Team.

Chart performance 
For the week dated April 30, 2022, "About Damn Time" debuted at number 50 on the US Billboard Hot 100 chart, with 7,000 digital downloads and 6.5 million U.S. streams. On the week dated May 14, 2022, the song jumped from number 60 to number 19, becoming her fourth top 20 hit. One week later, the song rose to number nine becoming her fourth top 10 hit. The song peaked at number one on the Billboard Hot 100 in its 14th week, becoming her second number one on the chart after "Truth Hurts", and the first number one hit to feature the word "damn" in its title. "About Damn Time" held at number one on the Hot 100 for 2 consecutive weeks.

Promotion 
Lizzo previewed the song on The Late Late Show with James Corden in March 2022. She first performed the song in full on Saturday Night Live on April 16, 2022, where she pulled double duty as both host and musical guest.

During the months following the song's release, Lizzo promoted "About Damn Time" heavily through TikTok, including a video celebrating the appointment of Ketanji Brown Jackson to the Supreme Court of the United States. TikTok personality Jaeden Gomez choreographed an easily replicable dance for the song that became a viral phenomenon on the platform; Lizzo spotlighted Gomez's choreography in multiple performance and tutorial videos.

On June 26, 2022, Lizzo performed "About Damn Time" at the 22nd BET Awards; during the song, Lizzo stated, "It’s about damn time we stand in our power. Black people, my people." On June 27, The Late Late Show with James Corden premiered a Carpool Karaoke segment with Lizzo, which culminated in Corden and Lizzo performing the song's TikTok choreography with a troupe of dancers. Jaeden Gomez appeared as a cameo in the segment.

Music video 
The song's music video was directed by Christian Breslauer. In the video, Lizzo runs out of a "Stressed & Sexy" support group meeting. While dancing in an school building, her outfit changes from a sweatsuit into a sequined jumpsuit that she wears for the remainder of the video. In further scenes, Lizzo dances down a hallway with an illuminated dance floor and plays a flute while walking atop the water in a swimming pool.

Charts

Weekly charts

Year-end charts

Certifications

Release history

In other media
"About Damn Time" was used in the pre-game montage for the October 15, 2022 broadcast of Hockey Night in Canada on Canadian sports channel Sportsnet celebrating its 70th season on television. The montage began with host Ron MacLean summarizing events that occurred when the program went on the air in 1952 before cutting into the song beginning. The game the montage served as the intro for the game between the Ottawa Senators and the Toronto Maple Leafs, which was broadcast on all Sportsnet regional channels except Sportsnet East, which broadcast the game between the Montreal Canadiens and the Washington Capitals instead. "About Damn Time" will be included in season one of "Just Dance 2023 Edition"

References

2022 songs
2022 singles
Lizzo songs
Billboard Hot 100 number-one singles
Atlantic Records singles
MTV Video Music Award for Best Video with a Social Message
American disco songs
Grammy Award for Best Remixed Recording, Non-Classical
Grammy Award for Record of the Year